This article contains information about the literary events and publications of 1706.

Events
April 8 – George Farquhar's Restoration comedy The Recruiting Officer is performed for the first time, at the Theatre Royal, Drury Lane, in London.
April/May – Philosopher Samuel Clarke attacks the views of Henry Dodwell on the immortality of the soul.
September 13 – Daniel Defoe leaves England for Edinburgh, Scotland, where he acts as a government agent to promote ratification of the Treaty of Union.
unknown date – The first translation of the New Testament into the Upper Sorbian language, made by pastor Michał Frencel who dies this year, is published by his son Abraham in Zittau.

New books

Prose
Anonymous – The Arabian Nights' Entertainments (serial, the first English translation of One Thousand and One Nights, taken from the first French translation)
Samuel Clarke – A Discourse Concerning the Unchangeable Obligations of Natural Religion
Stephen Clay – An Epistle from the Elector of Bavaria to the French King
Daniel Defoe
An Essay at Removing National Prejudices Against a Union with Scotland
A True Relation of the Apparition of one Mrs. Veal (attrib)
John Dennis – Essay on the Operas after the Italian Manner
White Kennett – The History of England from the Commencement of the Reign of Charles I to the End of William III
John Locke – Posthumous Works of Mr John Locke
Simon Ockley – Introductio ad linguas orientates
Jonathan Swift – Baucis and Philemon
Matthew Tindal – The Rights of the Christian Church Asserted
Ned Ward – The London Spy

Drama
Thomas Betterton – The Amorous Widow
Susanna Centlivre – 
 Love at a Venture
The Platonick Lady
Colley Cibber – Perolla and Izadora
Catherine Trotter Cockburn – The Revolution of Sweden
Antoine Danchet – Cyrus
Thomas D'Urfey – Wonders in the Sun (opera)
George Farquhar – The Recruiting Officer
George Granville – The British Enchanters, or No Magic Like Love
Delarivière Manley – Almyna, or The Arabian Vow
Mary Pix (attr.) – Adventures in Madrid
Jean-François Regnard – Le Légataire universel (The Residuary Legatee)
John Vanbrugh – The Mistake
José de Cañizares – El pastelero de Madrigal

Poetry

Richard Blackmore – An Advice to the Poets: a poem occasioned by the wonderful success of Her Majesty's arms, under the conduct of the Duke of Marlborough in Flanders
William Congreve – A Pindarique Ode.... The Conduct of the Duke of Marlborough
Daniel Defoe
Caledonia
A Hymn to Peace
Jure Divino (on divine right)
The Vision (on national union)
John Dennis – The Battle of Ramillia
John Philips – Cerealia: An imitation of Milton
Matthew Prior – The Squirrel
Thomas Tickell – Oxford
Isaac Watts – Horae Lyricae

Births
January 17 – Benjamin Franklin, American polymath and politician (died 1790)
February 10 – Benjamin Hoadly, English physician and dramatist (died 1757)
November 8 – Johann Ulrich von Cramer, German philosopher and jurist (died 1772)
December 17 – Émilie du Châtelet, French writer and translator (died 1749)

Deaths
January 21 – Adrien Baillet, French critic (born 1649)
February 27 – John Evelyn, English diarist (born 1620)
August 6 – Jean-Baptiste du Hamel, French natural philosopher (born 1624)
December 8 – Abraham Nicolas Amelot de la Houssaye, French historian (born 1634)
December 28 – Pierre Bayle, French encyclopedist and philosopher (born 1647)
unknown dates
John Phillips, English satirist (born 1631)
Rahman Baba, Indian Pashto poet (born 1632)
Guillaume Vandive, French printer and bookseller (born 1680)

References

 
Years of the 18th century in literature